Jesper Drost (born 11 January 1993) is a Dutch professional footballer who plays as a attacking midfielder for HHC Hardenberg.

Club career
Drost was born in Nunspeet. He joined FC Groningen from PEC Zwolle in summer 2015. He then moved to Heracles Almelo and back to PEC Zwolle.

On 31 August 2021, he moved to the third-tier club HHC Hardenberg.

Personal life
Drost was accused of attempted manslaughter, after he allegedly drove into two men with his car after a fight in a bar in Steenwijk in 2014. In December 2015 he was sentenced to do 50 hours of community service.

Career statistics

Club

Honours
PEC Zwolle
KNVB Cup: 2013–14; runner-up 2014–15
Johan Cruijff Shield: 2014
Eerste Divisie: 2011–12

References

External links
 
 Voetbal International profile 
  

1993 births
Living people
People from Nunspeet
Dutch footballers
Association football midfielders
Netherlands youth international footballers
Netherlands under-21 international footballers
Eredivisie players
Eerste Divisie players
Tweede Divisie players
PEC Zwolle players
FC Groningen players
Heracles Almelo players
HHC Hardenberg players
Footballers from Gelderland